Kostyantyn Ruslanovych Vivcharenko (born 10 June 2002) is a Ukrainian professional footballer who plays as a left-back for Ukrainian Premier League club Dynamo Kyiv.

Club career

Early years
Born in Odesa, Vivcharnko is a product of Chornomorets Odesa and Dynamo Kyiv academies. He played initially for Dynamo Kyiv in the Ukrainian Premier League Reserves.

Dynamo Kyiv
In August 2020, he was promoted to the senior squad, and was an unused substitution player in the winning Ukrainian Super Cup match against Shakhtar Donetsk on 25 August 2020. Vivcharenko made his debut for Dynamo Kyiv only on 27 July 2022, playing as an extra-time substitution player in a winning match against Turkish club Fenerbahçe in the 2022–23 UEFA Champions League second qualifying round.

Career statistics

Club

References

External links 
 
 

2002 births
Living people
Footballers from Odesa
Ukrainian footballers
Ukraine youth international footballers
Ukraine under-21 international footballers
Association football defenders
FC Dynamo Kyiv players
Ukrainian Premier League players